Guðgeir Leifsson (born 25 September 1951) is an Icelandic former footballer who played at both professional and international levels as a midfielder and inside forward.

Career
Leifsson played club football in Iceland, Scotland, Belgium, Switzerland and Canada for Víkingur, Fram, Morton, Charleroi, IBV, FC Bulle, Edmonton Drillers and FH.

He also played for the Iceland national team, appearing in 12 FIFA World Cup qualifying matches in the process.

References

External links
 

1951 births
Living people
Gudgeir Leifsson
Gudgeir Leifsson
Gudgeir Leifsson
Expatriate footballers in Scotland
Icelandic expatriate sportspeople in Scotland
Expatriate footballers in Belgium
Gudgeir Leifsson
Expatriate footballers in Switzerland
Icelandic expatriate sportspeople in Switzerland
Expatriate soccer players in Canada
Gudgeir Leifsson
Greenock Morton F.C. players
R. Charleroi S.C. players
Edmonton Drillers (1979–1982) players
Scottish Football League players
Belgian Pro League players
North American Soccer League (1968–1984) players
Association football midfielders
Association football inside forwards
Gudgeir Leifsson